Oy or OY may refer to:

Arts and entertainment
Oy, an animal character in Stephen King's Dark Tower series
Oy (album), a studio album of Iranian singer-songwriter Mohsen Namjoo
Oy (band), a music duo which performed at the Montreux Jazz Festival

Places
Oy, a village in the Oy-Mittelberg municipality, Bavaria, Germany
Oy, Russia,  a rural locality (selo) in Khangalassky District of the Sakha Republic, Russia
County Offaly, Ireland (code OY)

Transportation
Conair of Scandinavia, former Danish airline (flight code prefix OY-)
Omni Air International IATA airline designator
"OY" (Oscar Yankee), an aircraft registration code prefix for airplanes from Denmark
Bedford OY, a British army lorry introduced in 1939

Language
Oy or Oi language, spoken in Laos
Oy, a Yiddish exclamation of chagrin, dismay, exasperation or pain, commonly used in the phrase oy vey
oy, a digraph found in many languages
Oi (interjection), sometimes spelled "oy", a British slang interjection used to get someone's attention
Uk (Оу оу), a cyrillic homoglyph of Oy

Other uses
Osakeyhtiö, often abbreviated Oy, a type of Finnish limited company
Edin Øy (born 1997), Norwegian footballer
Nils E. Øy (born 1946), Norwegian newspaper editor

See also
Oi (disambiguation)
Jenna von Oÿ (born 1977), American actress and country music singer
Oye! (film), a 2009 Telugu film starring Siddharth Narayan and Shamili